John Cohen Coyle (28 September 1932 –14 May 2016) was a Scottish footballer.

Coyle started his career with Dundee United for whom he signed in 1950. His early years were interrupted by his National Service, while he also spent time on loan to Brechin City. As a result, by the beginning of the 1955-56 season he had made only eight first team appearances. From that point onwards however, his form was a revelation, with 77 goals in 88 appearances in the following two and a half seasons.

Despite Coyle's goals, United could do no better than mid-table mediocrity in the Division Two and when Clyde expressed interest in December 1957, Coyle expressed his desire to move to the Division One side. An £8,000 deal was concluded and Coyle moved to Glasgow where he made an immediate impression with the Bully Wee, scoring frequently during the second half of the 1957-58 season. He also scored the winning goal in the 1958 Scottish Cup Final, as Clyde defeated Hibernian 1–0 at Hampden Park.

Coyle's meteoric rise was confirmed when he was selected in the Scotland squad for the 1958 FIFA World Cup that summer. He did not make an appearance during the finals in Sweden however and indeed never actually played for the Scottish national side.

Coyle's younger brother Jimmy was also a professional footballer, being signed for Dundee United during the same period as his brother (Jimmy Reid and two other players also made the move at the same time) and playing alongside him at Tannadice Park for a season.

He died on 14 May 2016.

References

DUNDEE UNITED : 1946/47 - 2008/09, Post War English & Scottish Football League A - Z Player's Transfer Database
CLYDE : 1946/47 - 2008/09, Post War English & Scottish Football League A - Z Player's Transfer Database

1932 births
2016 deaths
Scottish footballers
Dundee United F.C. players
Brechin City F.C. players
Clyde F.C. players
1958 FIFA World Cup players
Scottish Football League players
Cambridge City F.C. players
Association football forwards
Scottish Junior Football Association players